The Parish Church of St Mary the Virgin is located at the highest point in the town centre of Bury, Greater Manchester, England. The church is located on the edge of the town centre, and is just a few minutes walk from the town's bus and tram station, as well as the Millgate Shopping Centre and the newly built the Rock. The main body of the church was completed on the 2 February 1876, the steeple predates it to 1842. It is recorded in the National Heritage List for England as a designated Grade I listed building. 

The church is a regimental church of the Lancashire Fusiliers, a former garrison church, and services are held for the garrison on Remembrance Sunday, Gallipoli Sunday and on other occasions.

History

Church records suggest that the first church was built on the site in 971 A.D. when parishes were first formed by King Edgar of England, although this is likely to have been a wood and thatch structure. Churches of this type of construction are thought to have been used until a church in the gothic style was completed in 1585. Between 1773 and 1780 the main body of this church was demolished and rebuilt leaving only the spire from the original church. The spire was replaced in 1842 but by 1870 the wood in the rest of the church had rotted and a new building was needed. The new church designed by the architect J. S. Crowther, leaving the 1842 spire in place, was officially opened on Candlemas Day 1876.

In July 2013, the church was the scene of a military funeral for murdered British soldier Lee Rigby. The service was attended by thousands of mourners, including Prime Minister David Cameron.

Architecture
The building is of dressed stone with slate roofs, with a buttressed 3-stage tower with a spire.  The interior features a hammerbeam and tie-beam roof and mosaic flooring.  There is stained glass by Hardman and Clayton and Bell.

The clock in the tower was the gift of Henry Whitehead, formerly High Sheriff of Lancashire.

See also

Listed buildings in Bury
List of churches in Greater Manchester
List of works by J. S. Crowther

References

External links

Home page of the Parish Church of St Mary the Virgin, Bury

Saint Mary
Church of England church buildings in Greater Manchester
Anglican Diocese of Manchester
Saint Mary